Perimede annulata is a moth in the family Cosmopterigidae. It was described by August Busck in 1914. It is found in Panama.

References

Natural History Museum Lepidoptera generic names catalog

Moths described in 1914
Chrysopeleiinae